"Giant" is a song by Scottish DJ and record producer Calvin Harris and English singer-songwriter Rag'n'Bone Man. The song was released through Columbia Records on 11 January 2019. It was written by Rag'n'Bone Man alongside Jamie Hartman and Troy Miller and produced by Harris.

"Giant" peaked at number two on the UK Singles Chart for five consecutive weeks. According to figures released by PPL, the track was the most played song in the UK in 2019.

The song topped the charts in Belgium and Scotland and reached the top 10 in Austria, Germany, Hungary, Ireland, the Netherlands, Poland, Slovakia, Slovenia and Switzerland; as well as the top 20 in Australia, Denmark, France, Italy, Lebanon, Norway and Romania.

In 2020, "Giant" was nominated for Song of the Year at the Brit Awards, closely losing out to Lewis Capaldi's "Someone You Loved". In the same year the song won the Ivor Novello award for PRS for Music Most Performed Work.

It was later used in a Lloyds Bank TV advert, which was released in February 2022.

Composition
"Giant" is a gospel-inspired dance and house song. It was called a "soulful number" by Lincoln Journal-Star, with the snippet posted online featuring Rag'n'Bone Man singing "I understood loneliness/Before I knew what it was/Saw the pills on the table/For your unrequited love/I would be nothing".

Promotion
Harris announced the song on 7 January through social media posting a preview. He and Rag'n'Bone Man performed it on The Graham Norton Show and at the 2019 Brit Awards.

Music video
A lyric video for "Giant" was released on 10 January 2019 on YouTube.

The official music video for "Giant" was released on 25 January 2019 on Harris's YouTube channel. The video features a man wearing a blue jacket and trousers in his room where he walks outside of his house and starts running through the suburbs all the way to a forest where he encounters a group of people riding on horses wearing red jackets and pants, and starts dancing with them, and ends with him looking above the sky. Harris and Rag'n'Bone Man also appear in the video.

Track listing
 Digital download 
 "Giant" – 3:49

 Audien extended remix 
 "Giant" (Audien Extended Remix) – 4:03

 Remixes – EP 
 "Giant" (Robin Schulz Remix) – 3:13
 "Giant" (Purple Disco Machine Remix) – 3:26
 "Giant" (Weiss Remix) – 3:54
 "Giant" (Michael Calfan Remix) – 3:21
 "Giant" (Audien Remix) – 3:33
 "Giant" (Laidback Luke Remix) – 2:33

Charts

Weekly charts

Year-end charts

Certifications

Release history

Covers 
This song has been covered by Rick Astley.

References

2019 singles
2019 songs
Calvin Harris songs
Rag'n'Bone Man songs
Songs written by Calvin Harris
Songs written by Jamie Hartman
Songs written by Rag'n'Bone Man
Number-one singles in Russia